In mathematics, diamond theorem may refer to:

 Aztec diamond theorem on tilings
 Diamond isomorphism theorem on modular lattices
 Haran's diamond theorem on Hilbertian fields
 Cullinane diamond theorem on group actions and the Miracle Octad Generator

See also
 Diamond (disambiguation)